Fjolla Shala (born 20 March 1993) is a footballer who last plays as a defender for Icelandic club Fylkir. She has player for the Icelandic junior national teams and in 2017, she debuted for the Kosovo national team.

Early life
Shala was born in Kosovo but moved to Germany when she was around six months old. In 1998, when she was five years old, the family moved to Iceland. At the age of nine, she started playing football with Leiknir Reykjavík's junior teams.

Club career
Shala started her senior team career with Leiknir in 2007. Later that season, she was loaned to Fjölnir where she appeared in 4 matches in the Icelandic top-tier Úrvalsdeild kvenna. In November 2008, she signed with Fylkir.

In 2012, Shala signed with Breiðablik. In May 2012, Shala broke her jaw in two places in a game after colliding with another player in the League Cup final. Despite the injury, she returned to the game after brief medical examination and played the last 20 minutes of the game.  In her first start since the injury, on 24 June, she suffered a vertebral fracture after an opposing player collided and fell on her, ending her season.

She missed the 2017 season after tearing her cruciate ligaments.

After missing the 2020 season due to pregnancy, Shala signed with Fylkir in May 2021.

National team career
Shala played for the Icelandic junior national teams from 2008 to 2012. In 2017, she was selected to the Kosovo national team for a friendly game against Montenegro. She appeared for the team during the UEFA Women's Euro 2021 qualifying cycle.

Honours

Club
Icelandic Champion (2): 2015, 2018
Icelandic Cup (3): 2013, 2016, 2018
Icelandic Super Cup (3): 2014, 2016, 2019
Icelandic League Cup: 2019

See also
List of Kosovo women's international footballers

References

External links
 
 
 
 

1993 births
Living people
Fjolla Shala
Fjolla Shala
Fjolla Shala
Fjolla Shala
Kosovan women's footballers
Kosovo women's international footballers
Fjolla Shala
Women's association football defenders